Coleophora facilis is a moth of the family Coleophoridae.

References

facilis
Moths described in 1988